(born February 15, 1978) is a Japanese singer from the greater Tokyo area in Japan. Her first single, "Chocolat a la mode", was released in 1997 on Epic Records (Japan). 
Her younger twin sister Heaco is also a singer. In 1998, Chocolat married the musician Akito Katayose from the band GREAT3 in Maui, Hawaii, which subsequently became her favorite place. In 2000, she moved from Epic Records to Warner Bros. Japan and later that year recorded the duet single "VERANDA" with her husband, credited as Akito Katayose featuring Chocolat. In 2005, she and her husband formed the group Chocolat & Akito.

Discography

Singles
  (May 21, 1997) Produced by shibuya-kei group Neil & Iraiza.
 (July 1, 1997）Produced by Hideki Kaji
"Twinkle Starberry" (November 1, 1997)
 (February 1, 1998)
 (May 21, 1998)
 (November 21, 1998)
 (July 1, 1999)
"FARGO" (November 20, 1999)
"VERANDA" (April 12, 2000) (as Akito Katayose featuring Chocolat), later used in a Nikka Cidre beverage advertisement)
"Roller Girl" (August 8, 2001)

Albums
one too many Chocolat (May 30, 1998)
 (August 21, 1999)
'henry (August 29, 2001)
CHOCOLATE NOTES (October 29, 2003)
Chocolat & Akito (as Chocolat & Akito) (September 19, 2005)
Tropical (as Chocolat & Akito) (February 14, 2007)

Video
"Star Mint" (March 1, 1998)
"Chocolat Video" (July 5, 2000)
"Walking in the Park" (live, as Chocolat & Akito)

See also
 Kahimi Karie
 Rei Harakami

References

External links
Official website
Artist page at Warner Music Japan

Sources
Much of this article was translated from the equivalent article in the Japanese Wikipedia, as retrieved on March 3, 2008.

1978 births
Japanese women pop singers
Living people
Singers from Tokyo
Shibuya-kei musicians
Japanese twins
Twin musicians
21st-century Japanese singers
21st-century Japanese women singers